Leeu-Gamka is a small town in the Western Cape province of South Africa, located  north-east of Cape Town in the Karoo.

History
The town of Leeu-Gamka owes its existence to the route chosen by Prime Minister John Molteno for the Cape Government Railways's western main line, from Cape Town towards the diamond fields at Kimberley. The railway line reached the meeting-point of the Leeu and Gamka rivers in 1879, and on 11 August of that year a station was opened on that location. It was initially named "Fraserburg Road", because it was the closest station to the town of Fraserburg,  to the north-west over the Nuweveld Mountains.

A small town grew around this station, with a church and school opening in 1896, and a hotel in 1898. In 1950 the station and town were renamed to "Leeu-Gamka".

Geography
Leeu-Gamka is located where the Leeu River enters the Gamka River; both rivers are intermittent in this region. "Leeu" and "Gamka" both mean "Lion", in Afrikaans and ǀXam respectively.

The town lies at an elevation of 552 m, in the southern Karoo; to the north are the Nuweveld Mountains, and to the south the Swartberge. From Leeu-Gamka the R353 road runs north-west to Fraserburg and Williston.

Demographics
The 2011 Census reported that, of the population of 2,727, some 91% described themselves as "Coloured" and 95% spoke Afrikaans.

Government and Infrastructure
Leeu-Gamka falls within the Prince Albert Local Municipality, which is part of the Central Karoo District Municipality. 
It has a primary school and a police station, and was served by a mobile clinic.

Recently, Leeu-Gamka established a new emergency medical services station in conjunction with the Western Cape Provincial Health Department to render support services to accident victims on the N1 en route to Cape Town and Johannesburg. Furthermore, a permanent community health center was erected, doing away with the previously used mobile clinic. The community also has a library and a new dam for domestic water supply. Leeu Gamka is mainly a community surrounded by farms and many of the citizens are dependent on work from these farms, with maintenance work by civil contracting engineering companies who subcontract for SANRAL.

References

Populated places in the Prince Albert Local Municipality
Populated places established in 1879